Nelson Business College was founded by English-born Richard Nelson in Cincinnati in 1856 and is said to have been the first business college in the United States. It eventually opened branches in Springfield, Ohio and Memphis, and was still operating in Cincinnati in 1930.
Among its alumni was May Company founder David May.

References

Defunct private universities and colleges in Ohio
Educational institutions established in 1856
Educational institutions disestablished in 1930
1856 establishments in Ohio
Education in Ohio